John Patrick Higgins (February 19, 1893 – August 2, 1955) was an officer in the United States Navy, chemist, attorney, and U.S. Representative from Massachusetts.

Higgins was born in Boston, Massachusetts, where he attended the public schools and graduated from Harvard University in 1917. During the First World War, he served as an Ensign in the United States Navy from 1917 until 1919. Returning to civilian life, Higgins was employed as a chemist from 1919 until 1922. He then resumed his academic studies, enrolling in the Boston University Law School and Northeastern College of Law in 1925 and 1926. He was admitted to the bar in 1927 and commenced practice in Boston.

Entering politics, Higgins was a  member of the Massachusetts House of Representatives from 1929 through 1934. He was elected as a Democrat to the Seventy-fourth Congress, was unopposed in his re-election to the Seventy-fifth Congress and served from January 3, 1935 until his resignation on September 30, 1937.

Higgins was appointed by Gov. Charles F. Hurley on October 1, 1937 as chief justice of the Massachusetts Superior Court, in which capacity he served until his death in 1955.  He was the first Irish Catholic to be chief justice and the youngest person ever appointed to the post.  He was a Knight of Columbus.

Appointed in January 1946 by the Justice Department with the approval of President Truman to be the United States judge on the 11 country International Military Tribunal for the Far East at Tokyo, Japan, Judge Higgins resigned in June 1946 to return to his family and his duties as Chief Justice of the Massachusetts Superior Court.

During his Congressional career, Congressman Higgins advocated for improved working conditions and benefits in America and against religious persecution in Mexico.

Higgins died in Boston and was interred in St. Joseph Cemetery, West Roxbury, Massachusetts.

See also
 1929–1930 Massachusetts legislature
 1933–1934 Massachusetts legislature

References

Works cited

External links

1893 births
1955 deaths
Democratic Party members of the Massachusetts House of Representatives
United States Navy officers
Boston University School of Law alumni
Harvard University alumni
Politicians from Boston
Judges of the International Military Tribunal for the Far East
Massachusetts state court judges
Military personnel from Massachusetts
Democratic Party members of the United States House of Representatives from Massachusetts
Northeastern University School of Law alumni
Lawyers from Boston
American judges of international courts and tribunals
20th-century American politicians
20th-century American judges
20th-century American lawyers